Madhav  is an upcoming Indian Gujarati-language action film produced by Vivek Thakkar and directed by Hetal Thakkar, starring Hitu Kanodia in the lead with an ensemble supporting cast. Mehul Surti and Parth Bharat Thakkar composed the film's songs and background score.

Premise 
A high-profile advocate is infamous for his malpractices. A police officer churns out a strategy to expose the advocate. What follow next are a series of events that lead to an interesting climax.

Cast 
 Hitu Kanodia as Madhav Sinh Jadeja
 Mehul Buch as Vishwas Desai
 Chetan Dahiya
 Vishal Shah
 Saloni Shah
 Lajja Desai as News Anchor
 Tushar Dave as journalist rahul

References

External links 
 

2022 films
2022 action films